Fatio is a surname, and may refer to:

Francis Philip Fatio, 18th-19th-century Swiss colonist of Florida
Jean Christophe Fatio, 17th-18th-century Swiss natural philosopher
Johannes Fatio, 17th-century Swiss surgeon
Louise Fatio, 20th-century children's author
Maurice Fatio, 20th-century American architect
Nicolas Fatio de Duillier, 17th-18th-century Swiss mathematician and astronomer
Pierre Fatio, 17th-18th-century Genevan politician
Victor Fatio, 19th-20th-century Swiss zoologist
Alfred Morel-Fatio, 19th-20th-century French linguist
Antoine Léon Morel-Fatio, 19th-century French naval painter

See also
Facio
Faccio
Ximenez-Fatio House